Evany José Metzker was a Brazilian blogger and journalist who in 2015 was found decapitated.

Death
Metzker had been working on a series of stories in the Jequitinhonha Valley, one of Brazil's poorest regions, when he was killed. After his body was found, investigators determined that he had been tortured, scalped, and then beheaded. Records show that Metzker had been investigating political corruption, child prostitution, and drug dealing. On his blog, he often reported on corrupt officials and politicians. He was missing for five days before police found his body. His family said the police had received an anonymous tip as to where they could find his remains which were subsequently found near Padre Paraíso in Minas Gerais.

Context
At least fourteen journalists have been killed since 2011 in retaliation for their work. Brazil is the third most dangerous country for journalists in Latin America after Mexico and Colombia. Other journalists were killed around the same time as Metzker.

Reactions
UNESCO and Reporters Without Borders, an international NGO, released official statements in response to the murder, as did the Minas Gerais Journalists Union, a regional organization.

See also
Human rights in Brazil
Edinaldo Filgueira
Décio Sá
Marcos de Barros Leopoldo Guerra
Orislandio Timóteo Araújo
Ítalo Eduardo Diniz Barros

References

2015 deaths
Assassinated Brazilian journalists
Murdered journalists